Tarek Loubani M.D. is a Canadian doctor and humanitarian. He runs the Glia Project, which seeks to provide medical supplies to impoverished locations, and developed a low-cost stethoscope in 2015. He serves as Associate Professor at the University of Western Ontario and works in emergency rooms.

In 2013, along with filmmaker John Greyson, he was arbitrarily arrested and spent seven weeks in Egypt's Tora Prison without charges. In 2018 he was shot in both legs while in the Gaza strip providing medical care during the 2018 border protests.

Early life and education 
Loubani was born in Kuwait and lived in Palestine as a child. He is the son of Mahmoud Loubani, who works at a medical clinic in New Brunswick. When he was nine years old, his family immigrated to Bathurst, New Brunswick as refugees. He attended high school in Bathurst before studying medicine at Dalhousie University, completing family medicine residency at McGill University in Montreal and Emergency Medicine Residency at Queen’s University in Kingston Ontario.

Career 
Loubani began serving as an assistant professor at the University of Western Ontario in 2010.

In April 2018, the Ontario Undergraduate Student Alliance awarded Loubani with their annual teaching excellence award.

Humanitarian work 

In 2015, Loubani designed a low-cost stethoscope which could be made for $2.50 using a 3D printer. He runs the Glia Project, which seeks to provide medical supplies to impoverished areas and has created designs for 3D printable surgical tools such as needle drivers and pulse oximeters.

Detainment in Egypt 
On August 15, 2013, Loubani and Greyson arrived in Egypt, intending to travel to Gaza. On August 16, they were arrested and detained in Tora Prison, where they were held without charges and were subjected to physical violence and harsh conditions. Egyptian authorities were considering a number of intended charges against Loubani and Greyson, including murder and "intention to kill," which both men denied. They were released after more than seven weeks in detention.

Injury in Gaza 
On Monday May 14, 2018, Loubani was shot in both legs near the border between the Gaza strip and Israel. Loubani was delivering emergency medicine to the protesters and believes he was targeted by an Israeli sniper. The paramedics wore high visibility vests to identify themselves as medical personnel, but in spite of that, Loubani says that a total of 19 medical professionals were shot on that day, including Musa Abuhassanin, the first paramedic to assist Loubani in the field, moments after he was shot.  In a May 17, 2018 interview by Democracy Now!'s Amy Goodman, Tarek narrated the moments after he was shot and Abuhassanin's subsequent death.

Awards 

 University of Western Ontario’s Award of Excellence in Undergraduate Teaching, 2017/2018
 Schulich School of Medicine & Dentistry, Bassel Khartabil Fellowship

References

External links 

 Glia Project, official website

Year of birth missing (living people)
Living people
Canadian emergency physicians
Palestinian emigrants to Canada
Palestinian refugees
Canadian humanitarians
University of Western Ontario alumni
People from Bathurst, New Brunswick
Dalhousie University alumni
Academic staff of the University of Western Ontario